The Diocese of Fall River is a Latin Church ecclesiastical territory, or diocese, of the Catholic Church in southern Massachusetts in the United States.

The diocese spans Barnstable County, Bristol County, Dukes County, Nantucket County, and the towns of Marion, Mattapoisett, and Wareham along the south coast of Plymouth County.  It is led by a bishop administering the diocese from the mother church, St. Mary's Cathedral in Fall River, Massachusetts. The Diocese of Fall River is a suffragan diocese in the ecclesiastical province of the metropolitan Archdiocese of Boston.

Diocesan statistics 
The Diocese of Fall River includes 147 parish priests, 90 permanent deacons, 16 religious brothers and 295 religious sisters. It has 96 parishes, 11 missions, a health care center, and five nursing homes.The total Catholic population of the area as of 2013 was approximately 313,115.

History

Early history 
Before the American Revolution, the British Province of Massachusetts Bay, which included southern Massachusetts and Cape Cod, had enacted laws prohibiting the practice of Catholicism in the colony. It was even illegal for a priest to reside there. To gain the support of Catholics for the Revolution, colonial leaders were forced to make concessions.  Massachusetts enacted religious freedom for Catholics in 1780.

Pope Pius VII erected the Diocese of Boston on April 8, 1808, including all of New England in its jurisdiction. The Diocese of Providence was erected by Pope Pius IX on February 17, 1872.  The pope removed the counties of Bristol, Barnstable, Dukes and Nantucket in Massachusetts from the Archdiocese of Boston.

1900 to 1970 
Pope Pius X erected the Diocese of Fall River on March 12, 1904.  He took all of the Massachusetts counties from Diocese of Providence for the new diocese, making it a suffragan of the Archdiocese of Boston.  He appointed Father William Stang as the first bishop of Fall River. On May 8, 1904, St. Mary's Cathedral was packed with worshipers for Stang's first mass, with police detachments controlling the crowd, estimated at 25,000 people, on the street outside the building. He established eleven parishes and founded Saint Anne's Hospital in Fall River.  One of the new parishes was St. Boniface, a German parish in New Bedford, Massachusetts.

After Stang's death on February 2, 1907, Pius X appointed Father Daniel Feehan as the second Bishop of Fall River on July 2, 1907. He was ordained a bishop on September 19, 1907. During his 27-year tenure, Feehan became known as the "Benevolent Bishop" and established thirty-six parishes. To assist Feehan, Pope Pius IX named the Reverend James Cassidy as coadjutor bishop of the diocese in January 1934.  Feehand died in office on July 19, 1934. Bishop Feehan High School was named in his honor. Cassidy automatically succeeded him as bishop of Fall River.

As bishop, Cassidy took an active interest in the needs of the elderly, founding several homes for senior citizens. In January 1951, he published a pastoral letter forbidding girls cheerleading at Catholic high schools in the diocese, citing the indecency of their outfits.  He also banned football games at night. In 1945, Pope Pius XII appointed  Reverend James Connolly to serve as coajutor bishop. Following the death of Cassidy in May 1951, Connolly automatically became the new bishop.  Bishop Cassidy High School, now known as Coyle and Cassidy High School, was named in Cassidy's honor.

As bishop, one of Connolly's special concerns was with providing secondary education in the four urban areas of the diocese. As a result, four Catholic high schools were constructed under his guidance. Bishop Connolly High School was dedicated in his name in 1967. He also founded the diocesan newspaper, The Anchor. Connolly attended all four sessions of the Second Vatican Council in Rome.

1970 to present 
After Connolly retired in 1970, Pope Paul VI appointed Daniel Cronin as the fifth bishop of Fall River. Cronin continued the work of implementing the decrees of the Second Vatican Council and supported liturgical renewal, continuing education of the clergy and the restoration of the permanent diaconate. He devoted himself to the pastoral care of the sick in hospitals, to the expansion of Catholic Counseling and Social Services, to the Family Life Ministry and other various activities. Late in 1991, Pope John Paul II appointed Cronin as archbishop of the Archdiocese of Hartford.

To replace Cronin, John Paul II appointed Bishop Seán Patrick O'Malley in 1992 as the new bishop of Fall River.  His main challenge was to settle the sexual abuse scandal in the diocese.  In 2002, John Paul II named O'Malley as bishop of the Diocese of Palm Beach and appointed George Coleman as his sucessor.  Coleman retired in 2014.

On July 3, 2014, Pope Francis appointed Bishop Edgar Moreira da Cunha as the eighth bishop of the Diocese of Fall River; he was installed September 24, 2014.

Sexual abuse

In the early 1990's, revelations surfaced about how the Diocese of Fall River protected former priest James Porter from potential charges of sexual abuse between 1960 and 1964. In 1960, Porter was assigned to St. Mary's parochial grammar school, where he was charged with managing the school's altar boys  Parents soon started filing complaints against Porter with the diocese.  However, the diocese took no action against him until 1963, by which time at least four parents had complained about his inappropriate behavior. Diocese officials then moved Porter to a parish in Fall River without notifiying police or the new parish about the allegations.  More complaints were made against Porter. In 1964, Porter was arrested on sex abuse charges. However, he was only sent out for inpatient hospital treatment.  At some point, he left the priesthood and started a family

Porter was arrested again in Minnesota in 1992.  He also faced charges in Massachusetts in 1993.  He was accused of abusing more than 60 children in North Attleboro, Massachusetts, and nearly 100 children elseware  in southeastern Massachusetts. In 1993, Porter's lawyer struck a plea bargain on the Massachusetts charges, and Porter was sentenced to 18 to 20 years in prison, with the possibility of parole, with counseling, after six years. He was denied parole throughout his sentence. Porter completed his prison sentence in 2004, but was held in prison until his death pending a civil commitment hearing. In December 1993, Bishop O'Malley acknowledged the diocese's protection of Porter and apologized.

On December 11, 2020, a grand jury at Barnstable Superior Court indicted Father Mark R. Hession, also known as “Father Mark,” on two counts of rape, one count of indecent assault and battery on a child under age 14, and one count of intimidation of a witness. Hession was known to many locals because of his past work at Our Lady of Victory Parish in Centerville, Massachusetts . Hession also worked closely with the Kennedy family and even delivered the homily at Senator Ted Kennedy's funeral in August 2009.

Bishops

Bishops of Fall River
William Stang (1904–1907)
Daniel Francis Feehan (1907–1934)
James Edwin Cassidy (1934–1951; coadjutor bishop 1934)
James Louis Connolly (1951–1970; coadjutor bishop 1945–1951)
Daniel Anthony Cronin (1970–1992), appointed Archbishop of Hartford
Seán Patrick O'Malley (1992–2002), appointed Bishop of Palm Beach and later Archbishop of Boston (created Cardinal in 2006)
George William Coleman (2003–2014)
Edgar Moreira da Cunha (2014–present)

Auxiliary Bishops of Fall River
James Edwin Cassidy (1930-1934), appointed Coadjutor Bishop of Fall River (see above)
James Joseph Gerrard (1959-1976)

Other priests of this diocese who became bishops
 John Edward Morris (priest here, 1914–1921), appointed Prefect of Peng-Yang in 1930
 William Otterwell Brady, appointed Bishop of Sioux Falls in 1939
 Humberto Sousa Medeiros, appointed Bishop of Brownsville in 1966 and Archbishop of Boston in 1970; future Cardinal
 Joseph Patrick Delaney (priest here, 1960–1971), appointed Bishop of Fort Worth in 1981

Education

Schools
Bishop Connolly High School in Fall River
Bishop Stang High School in Dartmouth
Bishop Feehan High School in Attleboro
Saint John Paul II High School in Hyannis

Closed
Coyle and Cassidy School in Taunton

Colleges
Stonehill

Superintendents 
The current Superintendent of Schools is Stephen Perla. 
The following is a list of superintendents:
 George A. Milot, PhD (2001–2011)
 Michael S. Griffin (2011–2016)
Stephen Perla (2016 – present)

Landmarks

In addition to St. Mary's Cathedral, two other major churches in the diocese are St. Anthony of Padua in New Bedford, Santo Christo Church and Shrine, and St. Anne's both in Fall River.

The Diocese of Fall River is also home to the National Shrine of Our Lady of La Salette, owned and operated by the Missionaries of Our Lady of La Salette.  The shrine, perhaps most famous for its "Festival of Light" that spans over ten acres, now accompanied by a display of over a hundred creches from countries where the Missionaries of La Salette are active, during the Advent and Christmas seasons, offers spiritual retreats, liturgical services, sacramental confession, concerts of Christian music, and other religious programming throughout the year.

Suppressed parishes

Province of Boston

See also

 Catholic Church by country
 Catholic Church in the United States
 Ecclesiastical Province of Boston
 Global organisation of the Catholic Church
 List of Roman Catholic archdioceses (by country and continent)
 List of Roman Catholic dioceses (alphabetical) (including archdioceses)
 List of Roman Catholic dioceses (structured view) (including archdioceses)
 List of the Catholic dioceses of the United States
 Plenary Councils of Baltimore

References

External links

Roman Catholic Diocese of Fall River Official Site
Catholic Hierarchy Profile of the Diocese of Fall River
Cathedral of Saint Mary of the Assumption (Fall River)
TheCatholicDirectory.com – Helping People Find Mass Worldwide

 
Fall River, Massachusetts
Catholic Church in Massachusetts
Christian organizations established in 1904
Fall River
Fall River